Larry Baumel (born May 26, 1944 in Sparta, Wisconsin) is a retired NASCAR Winston Cup Series driver whose career spanned from 1969 to 1971.

Career
His average start is 24th place while his average finish is 25th. Baumel's total career earnings is $30,315 ($ when adjusted for inflation) and has three last-place finishes. Larry has also raced in the Late Model Stock Car Series in addition to the USAC Stock Car series and the NASCAR Grand National Series. His main sponsor throughout most of his career was Auto Lad and his favorite racing number is #68.

References

External links
 

1944 births
Living people
NASCAR drivers
People from Sparta, Wisconsin
Racing drivers from Wisconsin